Frederik Bay (born 6 August 1997) is a Danish footballer who plays for Danish 1st Division club HB Køge.

Club career
Bay was part of the FC Copenhagen "School of Excellence" academy and has played a number of matches the club's youth team and reserve team. In August 2016, he was included in Copenhagen's first team squad. He made his official debut for their first team in a Danish Cup match on 26 October 2016 against Jammerbugt, where Bay played for one half.

On 31 January 2017, on the last day of the transfer window, it was announced that Bay moved to Helsingør in the second-tier Danish 1st Division on a six-month loan, where his contract with Copenhagen would also expire. After the expiry of his contract with Copenhagen, Bay joined FC Helsingør on a permanent contract.

After five years and 128 total games for Helsingør, it was confirmed on 29 June 2022, that Bay had joined fellow league club HB Køge.

International career
Bay has gained five caps in total for Denmark U18 and Denmark U19, respectively.

References

1997 births
Living people
Danish men's footballers
Danish Superliga players
Danish 1st Division players
Danish 2nd Division players
F.C. Copenhagen players
FC Helsingør players
HB Køge players
Association football defenders
Denmark youth international footballers